John Stanfield (May 18, 1868 – January 22, 1934) was an industrialist and Conservative politician in Nova Scotia, Canada, who represented Colchester in both the Canadian House of Commons (1907–17) where he served as Chief Government Whip (1911–17) and the Canadian Senate (1921–34). He was the brother of the politician Frank Stanfield.

Early life 
He was born in Charlottetown, Prince Edward Island, the son of Charles E. Stanfield and Lydia Dawson. The family moved to Truro, Nova Scotia while Stanfield was still young, and attended Truro High School. With his brother Frank Stanfield, he took over the operation of his father's woollen mills in 1896; the company was incorporated as Stanfield's Limited in 1906. In 1902, he married Sadie Yorston.

Career 
Stanfield represented Colchester in the House of Commons of Canada from 1907 to 1917 as a Conservative member and served as Chief Government Whip from 1911 to 1917 when he retired from the Commons.

He was a Lieutenant in the Colchester and Hants Rifle Corps Reserve and took a battalion overseas during World War I.  He was given command of the Nova Scotia Highland Brigade in 1916 but was invalided home in 1917. He was later an Honorary Colonel of the 76th Regiment of the Colchester and Hants Rifle Corps.

Stanfield later sat for Colchester division in the Senate of Canada from 1921 to 1934. He died in Truro, Nova Scotia in 1934 at the age of 65.

Electoral record

External links

References 

1868 births
1934 deaths
Canadian military personnel of World War I
Conservative Party of Canada (1867–1942) MPs
Members of the House of Commons of Canada from Nova Scotia
Canadian senators from Nova Scotia
People from Charlottetown